Spelling Jungle, also known as Yobi's Basic Spelling Tricks or Yobi's Magic Spelling Tricks, is an educational adventure game created by Bright Star Technology and released by Sierra in 1993 for both Windows and Macintosh PCs. The program is designed to strengthen reading, spelling, and logic skills in children ages 7–10.

The objective of Spelling Jungle is to paddle a raft up the river and stopping the flooding at its source. The player must make frequent stops in his journey and complete puzzles, where the player must walk over letter tiles in order to spell out a certain word, avoiding enemies like lions, alligators, or demons, in order to advance farther up the river. The game features 101 levels total that become more difficult and complex as the player ventures farther upriver.

Spelling Jungle was also released under the name "Yobi's Magic Spelling Tricks" and "Yobi's Basic Spelling Tricks". It is also referred to as "Spelling Demons" in the game's owner's manual In 1994, Sierra released a sequel to the game entitled "Spelling Blizzard"

Gameplay

Spelling Jungle is an adventure game whose objective is to paddle to the head of the river to stop the river's flooding. The game consists of two distinct areas: a puzzle map, where the player must spell out a particular word by collecting letter tiles in the correct order, and a spelling test, where the player must correctly spell a certain number of words before he may advance. The objective of the puzzle map portion of the game is to collect letter tiles by walking over them in the correct order in order to spell the given word. A puzzle map gives the player an overhead view of the area and provides the word that the player must spell for that particular round as well as a mnemonic at the bottom of the screen to help remember how to spell the word. Early levels are simple, requiring the player only to gather letters in the correct order, but the puzzles become more difficult as the player advances through the game. For later levels, while collecting letter tiles, the player must also avoid enemies, such as rhinoceroses and tigers, avoid hazards, like hot coals and bottomless pits, and make use of tools, such as boulders and vehicles, in order to gather all the letters. Once the player has collected all the letters in the correct order, most hazards disappear, but he must find a way to get back to his raft in order to move on to the next section. The second phase of each level consists of a spelling test, where the player is asked to spell words, starting with the one that was featured on the previous puzzle map. If the player spells the word correctly, his raft will move a little bit father forward. If the player spells enough words correctly, he will advance to the next puzzle map.

Development
Spelling Jungle was originally distributed by Bright Star Technology under the name "Basic Spelling Tricks". When Bright Star Technology was acquired by Sierra, the game was released under the name "Yobi's Magic Spelling Tricks", but it is also referred to as "Yobi's Basic Spelling Tricks", "Basic Spelling", and "Demon Spelling Tricks". In 1994, the name was changed again to "Spelling Jungle", though no significant changes were made to the program itself. The same year, a sequel to Spelling Jungle was released entitled "Spelling Blizzard". This sequel, though more difficult than the original, is nearly identical in gameplay and story except that it has an arctic rather than a jungle theme.

Reception
Computer Gaming World in 1994 said of Yobi's Magic Spelling Tricks for Macintosh that "For kids who find Nintendo games a challenge, the mazes are very appealing". The magazine concluded that it "offers good educational content, some rather challenging puzzles, and a competitive motif that keeps youngsters interested".

The sequel, Spelling Blizzard, received a score of 2.5 out of 5 at Allgame.

Notes

References

1993 video games
Children's educational video games
Classic Mac OS games
Sierra Entertainment games
Sierra Discovery games
Video games set in forests
Windows games
Video games developed in the United States